Vallabhnagar is a tehsil of Udaipur district in Rajasthan, India.

History 
Before the formation of the Republic of India, the territory of present-day Vallabhnagar tehsil was part of the former Udaipur State. With the formation of the United State of Rajasthan (precursor to the state of Rajasthan) in 1948, the new district of Udaipur was constituted which included Vallabhnagar tehsil.

In 2017, Bhindar tehsil, which had been a sub-tehsil of Vallabhnagar tehsil since 1959, was declared to be a separate tehsil. This restructuring reduced Vallabhnagar tehsil's area from 983 square kilometers to 383 square kilometers.

Geography
The area of Vallabhnagar tehsil is 539 square kilometres. The annual average rainfall in Vallabhnagar tehsil is 608 mm, with an average of 30 rainy days per year.

References 

Tehsils of Rajasthan
Tehsils of Udaipur district